Les Écrits nouveaux was a literary magazine founded in 1917 and published until 1922.

In 1922, the literary magazine became La Revue européenne.

References

External links
 Les Écrits nouveaux in Gallica, the digital library of BnF.

1917 establishments in France
1922 disestablishments in France
Defunct literary magazines published in France
Monthly magazines published in France
Magazines established in 1917
Magazines disestablished in 1922